The Washington Capitals are a professional American ice hockey team based in Washington, D.C.; in the 1985–86 season, the team finished with 107 points and won 50 games for the first time in franchise history, good enough for the third-best record in the National Hockey League (NHL). However, they were bounced out of the playoffs in the second round by the New York Rangers.

The 107 points scored by the Capitals in this season would not be surpassed until the 2008–09 season, when the team scored 108 points in the regular season.

Offseason
The Washington Capitals picked up Yvon Corriveau in the first round (19th overall) of the 1985 NHL Entry Draft.

Regular season
The fifty wins which the Washington Capitals won during the regular season placed them second in the Patrick Division, after the Philadelphia Flyers, and earned them a berth in the playoffs, which was the fourth consecutive time it had made the playoffs since the 1982–83 NHL season.

Final standings

Schedule and results

Playoffs
The 1985–86 NHL season was the fourth time the Washington Capitals had made the playoffs, and finally defeated the New York Islanders in a playoff series three games to none. However, the Capitals were eliminated by the New York Rangers four games to two in a best of seven series.

Patrick Division Semi-finals
New York Islanders vs. Washington Capitals

Patrick Divisional Finals
New York Rangers vs. Washington Capitals

Player statistics

Regular season
Scoring

Goaltending

Playoffs
Scoring

Goaltending

Note: GP = Games played; G = Goals; A = Assists; Pts = Points; +/- = Plus/minus; PIM = Penalty minutes; PPG=Power-play goals; SHG=Short-handed goals; GWG=Game-winning goals
      MIN=Minutes played; W = Wins; L = Losses; T = Ties; GA = Goals against; GAA = Goals against average; SO = Shutouts; SA=Shots against; SV=Shots saved; SV% = Save percentage;

Awards and records
 The 107 points scored by the Washington Capitals in this season would not be surpassed until the 2008–09 Washington Capitals season, when the team scored 108 points in the regular season.
 Alan Haworth scored a goal in nine consecutive games, setting Washington record.

Transactions

Draft picks
Washington's draft picks at the 1985 NHL Entry Draft held at the Metro Toronto Convention Centre in Toronto, Ontario.

Farm teams

See also
 1985–86 NHL season

References

External links
 

Washington Capitals seasons
Wash
Wash
Washing
Washing